This list of University of South Carolina people includes alumni that are graduates or non-matriculating students, and former professors and administrators of the University of South Carolina, with its primary campus located in the American city of Columbia, South Carolina.

Alumni

Arts, entertainment, and media

Athletics

Baseball

Men's basketball

Football

Men's soccer

Other sports

Business, education, and sciences

Government, law, and politics

United States senators from South Carolina

United States representatives from South Carolina

United States representatives and senators from other states

Governors of South Carolina

Governors of other states

Military

Religion and ministry

Presidents of the University of South Carolina

Faculty and administrators

Former faculty and administrators

See also

References 

University of South Carolina people